Dr. Gary Vena, Ph.D. is a Professor of English and Drama at Manhattan College in New York City, NY in the United States. Vena has received a Bachelor of Arts (B.A.) from Fordham University, two Master of Arts (M.A.) degrees, one from The Catholic University of America and the other from New York University, and a Ph.D. from New York University.

External links 
Profile at Manhattan College's website

Catholic University of America alumni
American academics of English literature
Fordham University alumni
New York University alumni
Living people
Writers about theatre
Theatrologists
Year of birth missing (living people)